Beyond Daylight is the fourth full-length studio album by the German progressive metal band Vanden Plas. It was released on 28 January 2002 by InsideOut/SPV Records.

Track listing

Personnel

Andy Kuntz – Vocals
Stephan Lill – Guitars
Günter Werno – Keyboards
Torsten Reichert – Bass
Andreas Lill – Drums

References

2002 albums
Vanden Plas (band) albums
Inside Out Music albums